Julia Boserup and Nicole Gibbs were the defending champions, but chose not to participate.

Michaëlla Krajicek and Maria Sanchez won the title, defeating Jamie Loeb and Chanel Simmonds in the final, 7–5, 6–1.

Seeds

Draw

References 
 Draw

Red Rock Pro Open - Doubles
2016 Red Rock Pro Open